Stara Gora is a dispersed settlement southeast of Rožna Dolina in the Municipality of Nova Gorica in western Slovenia. One of the two town cemeteries of Nova Gorica is located in Stara Gora.

References

External links
Stara Gora on Geopedia

Populated places in the City Municipality of Nova Gorica